During the 2022 Russian invasion of Ukraine, Russian authorities and armed forces have committed war crimes by carrying out deliberate attacks against civilian targets and indiscriminate attacks in densely populated areas. The Russian military exposed the civilian population to unnecessary and disproportionate harm by using cluster munitions and by firing other explosive weapons with wide-area effects such as bombs, missiles, heavy artillery shells and multiple launch rockets.

As of the beginning of July, the attacks had resulted in the documented death or injury of more than 10,000 civilians including the documented death of 335 children, although the actual numbers are likely much higher. On 5 July, the UN High Commissioner for Human Rights Michelle Bachelet reported that most of the civilian casualties documented by her office had been caused by the Russian army's repeated use of explosive weapons in populated areas. Bachelet said that the heavy civilian toll from the use of such indiscriminate weapons and tactics had become "indisputable".

Reports on the use of cluster munitions raised concerns about the high numbers of civilian casualties and the long-lasting danger of unexploded ordnance. According to the Office of the United Nations High Commissioner for Human Rights, weapons equipped with cluster munitions have been used both by Russian armed forces and pro-Russian separatists, as well as to a lesser degree by Ukrainian armed forces.

Chernihiv Oblast

Bombing of Chernihiv 

On 3 March 2022, just after 12:00 (UTC+2), six unguided aerial bombs were filmed falling in a residential area in Chernihiv. Analysis by Amnesty International found that (at least) eight bombs fell. Two schools (No.18 and No.21) and 8 private houses in the intersection between the Viacheslava Chornovila and Kruhova streets were destroyed, 7 more houses were also heavily damaged in the vicinity of the Biloruskyi Lane. Local emergency services recorded 38 men and 9 women killed (47 in total) by the bombing and 18 people injured. As Amnesty International was unable to identify a legitimate military target nearby, it said the attack could be a war crime. Human Rights Watch (HRW) found no evidence of a "significant [military] target in or near the intersection when it was hit ... pointing to a potentially deliberate or reckless indiscriminate attack". HRW called for an International Criminal Court investigation and a United Nations commission of inquiry to decide if a war crime had occurred and to hold to account the people responsible. The HRW investigation included telephone interviews with three witnesses and two other Chernihiv residents, and analysis of 22 videos and 12 photographs. The witnesses interviewed by HRW stated that they were unaware of military targets or operations in the neighbourhood. Matilda Bogner, Head of the UN Human Rights Monitoring Mission in Ukraine, stated that the bombing "violated the principles of distinction, of proportionality, the rule on feasible precautions and the prohibition of indiscriminate attacks". A bomb crater consistent with a 500 kg bomb was found. FAB-500 bombs were known to be used during the invasion.

On 16 March 2022, a Russian attack killed 14 civilians who were waiting in a line for bread in the city, The event was reported by Governor of Chernihiv Oblast Vyacheslav Chaus and the United States Embassy in Kyiv. The incident happened at around 10:00 UTC+3. Victims of the incident were killed following a blast shot from heavy artillery. These civilians were unarmed and some of them survived the shelling; they were taken to medical facilities by the Chernihiv police. An American citizen was among the dead. Around four hours after the incident, the Chernihiv Regional Prosecutor's Office filed a legal case regarding the attack. The Chernihiv Oblast branch of the Security Service of Ukraine also started an investigation.

Dnipropetrovsk Oblast 
On 7 April, there were three strikes on the region during the day. Russian forces struck the Sinelnykivsky and Kryvorizky districts. About four people died and seven were injured. Two civilians also went missing.

Dnipro missile strikes 

On 11 March 2022, three missiles hit the city and killed one person, striking close to an apartment building and a kindergarten. On 28 June, Russian forces fired six 3M-14E Kalibr cruise missiles from the Black Sea to Dnipro at around 5:30 local time. One of them hit an Avtodiesel car repair shop, killing a man and a woman. Seven other people, including a six-year-old boy, were injured. Fragments of the Kalibr missile were found afterwards.

On the morning of 29 September 2022 missiles hit residential areas in Dnipro, and three people were killed. The central bus station was also hit. Dnipro was also hit during the 10 October 2022 Russian missile strikes. It was hit by at least five missiles, During the attack that took place during morning rush hour three civilians were killed.

On 18 October 2022 Russian missiles hit energy infrastructure in Dnipro. One man was injured and a large-scale fire broke out at an energy facility that was severely damaged, more than three dozen residential buildings were damaged, including schools and kindergartens. On 25 October 2022 two people were killed, including a pregnant woman, and four injured due to a fire at a gas station after fragments of a Russian missile hit it.

On 26 November 2022, around noon, a Russian missile strike on Dnipro injured 13 people and partially destroyed seven private houses in Dnipro's Amur-Nyzhnodniprovskyi District. Dnipro mayor Borys Filatov reported that city communications and infrastructure were not damaged. Governor Valentyn Reznichenko stated that due to the attack one woman was hospitalised in critical condition. The following day Reznichenko reported that a man was found dead under the rubble. Another Russian missile strike destroyed an enterprise on the night of 29 November 2022, no casualties were reported.

Dnipro residential building airstrike 

On 19 January the official casualty rate was stated as 46 people killed, 80 injured (12 in critical condition) and 11 people reported missing. 14 children were reported among the injured, and 39 inhabitants were rescued. The destruction left about 400 people homeless. This strike became the most destructive Russian attack on a residential building in Ukraine in the last six months. A three-day period of mourning was declared in Dnipro.

Bombing of Kryvyi Rih 

On 7 April, a rocket hit a residential sector in Kryvyi Rih. One person was injured. On 18 April, Russian forces attacked the Kryvorizka district. On 3 September, the Shirokiv community came under fire in the Kryvorizka district. Many houses were destroyed. There were no victims.

Chaplyne railway station attack 

On 24 August 2022, the Independence Day of Ukraine, Russian forces struck Chaplyne, damaging a railway station, a utility building, and a residential neighborhood. Several passenger rail cars were set on fire and destroyed. Ukrainian sources described multiple rockets or missiles being used in several attacks. At least 25 people (including 2 children) died and about 31 were injured. The Russian defense ministry claimed it had targeted a military train using a single Iskander missile, and that the attack had killed 200 Ukrainian soldiers. According to an Associated Press reporter on site, there was no visible indication that Ukrainian soldiers were among the victims. International legal experts said that if civilians were the target, the attack might qualify as a war crime.

Donetsk Oblast 

There were at least 7,395 civilian casualties (of which 3,511 killed) in the government-controlled territory of Donetsk and Luhansk regions and 2,035 civilian casualties (of which 467 killed) in the territory controlled by the Russian forces and affiliated groups between February and November 2022. The months-long siege of Mariupol caused a large number of civilian casualties and a few other attacks with many civilian casualties occurred in the region. Donetsk itself experienced several attacks with civilian casualties, including the shelling of a market and the mayor's office. Pro-Russian officials blamed Ukraine for the attacks while Ukraine blamed Russia or did not comment on the attacks.

Vuhledar cluster bomb attack 
On 24 February, 10:30 (UTC), Vuhledar was attacked with an 9M79 Tochka missile, which landed next to a hospital and killed four civilians and injured ten. Amnesty International described it as "irrefutable evidence of violations of international humanitarian law and international human rights law" by Russian forces. Human Rights Watch (HRW) found that the Vuhledar hospital attack used a 9N123 cluster munition. The 9N123 contains fifty 9N24 individual submunitions, which each split into 316 bomblets. HRW based its analysis on contacts with the hospital and municipal administrations and multiple photographic evidence. HRW called for Russian forces to stop making "unlawful attacks with weapons that indiscriminately kill and maim". The press secretary of the Russian Federation, Dmitry Peskov, denied Russian involvement, saying that this type of ammunition is used by the Armed Forces of Ukraine.

Mass shelling of civilian infrastructure in Mariupol 

Between 1–2 March, Russian artillery reportedly shelled a densely populated neighbourhood in the city for nearly 15 hours, causing significant destruction. Deputy mayor Sergei Orlov reported that "at least hundreds of people [were] dead." On 16 March the Institute for the Study of War (ISW) reported that Russian forces continued to commit war crimes in Mariupol including "targeting civilian infrastructure". On 18 March, Lieutenant General James Hockenhull, Chief of Defence Intelligence for the United Kingdom (UK), described "continued targeting of civilians in Mariupol". As of 20 March local authorities have estimated that at least 2,300 people were killed during the siege.

On 20 March 2022, Ukrainian authorities announced that Russian troops had bombed an art school in the city where hundreds (about 400) were sheltering. The Mariupol City Council made the announcement through the instant messaging service Telegram, highlighting that many of those sheltering in the school were women, children and elderly. However, Petro Andryushchenko, an advisor to the Mayor of Mariupol, raised the concern that there was no exact number on how many people were using the school as a refuge.

By 18 April, Ukrainian officials estimated that at least 95% of Mariupol had been destroyed in the fighting, largely as a result of the Russian bombing campaigns. City officials reported that up to 21,000 civilians had been killed. On 16 June, the UN High Commissioner for Human Rights said that evidence strongly suggests the Russian armed forces committed serious violations of international humanitarian and human rights law in Mariupol, including the shelling and rocket attacks that destroyed much of the city. In a separate statement, Human Rights Watch said Russia's military tactics were indiscriminate and caused a disproportionate effect on the civilians in the city. It also warned that going forward, access to the city and preservation of evidence were likely to be issues, given Russia's occupation of the city, and it called for international accountability.

Independent media and the Ukrainian side accused the Russian military of bombing civilian shelters with cluster munitions during shelling of the city and attacks on Azovstal. According to the mayor of Mariupol, at the end of April, during the two-month siege of the city by Russian troops, more than 20 thousand people died - twice as many than the 2 year occupation of the city during World War II. Oksana Pokalchuk, director of Amnesty International Ukraine, said they were able to prove the use of cluster munitions by Russia after interviewing a victim who provided them with a fragment of ammunition that was removed from his thigh.

Targeting of humanitarian corridors 
During shelling of Mariupol by Russian forces, a number of attempts to establish a humanitarian evacuation corridor to evacuate civilians from the city were made, but failed when the corridor was targeted by Russian forces. On 5 March, a five-hour ceasefire was declared, but evacuations were quickly halted after shelling continued during the declared time. The next day, the International Committee of the Red Cross (ICRC) announced that a second attempt to establish an evacuation corridor had failed.

Hospital airstrike 

On 9 March, the Children's and Maternity Hospital No. 3, a hospital complex functioning both as a children's hospital and maternity ward, was bombed several times by Russian forces during a ceasefire, killing at least four people and injuring at least seventeen, also leading to at least one stillbirth Ukrainian authorities described the damage to the hospital as "colossal". Video footage following the attacks showed "much of the front of the building ... ripped away" and "mangled cars burning outside". Hospital wards were "reduced to a wreckage, walls [had] collapsed, rubble cover[ed] medical equipment, windows [were] blown out and shattered glass [was] everywhere". On 10 March, local authorities stated that one girl and two other people had been killed in the bombing, one of whom was a woman at a late stage of pregnancy; neither she nor her unborn child survived. Ukrainian president Volodymyr Zelenskyy stated that people had "hidden" from the attack in time, minimising the number of casualties.

Deputy Mayor of Mariupol, Sergei Orlov, stated, "We don't understand how it is possible in modern life to bomb [a] children's hospital." Mariupol City Council described the bombing by Russian aircraft as deliberate. Zelenskyy claimed that the attack constituted "proof that the genocide of Ukrainians [was] taking place". Sergei Orlov, deputy mayor of Mariupol, described the attack as both a war crime and genocide. British prime minister Boris Johnson described the attack as "depraved". Jen Psaki, press secretary of United States president Joe Biden, stated that "It is horrifying to see the ... barbaric use of military force to go after innocent civilians in a sovereign country." Josep Borrell, High Representative of the European Union for Foreign Affairs and Security Policy, described the bombing as a "heinous war crime". Cardinal Secretary of State of the Vatican City Pietro Parolin expressed dismay at the bombing, calling it an "unacceptable attack on civilians". António Guterres, Secretary-General of the United Nations, wrote that the attack was "horrific" and that "this senseless violence must stop."

On 10 March, the Russian Minister of Foreign Affairs and the Ministry of Defence publicly claimed that the bombing was justified. According to Ukrayinska Pravda, foreign minister Sergey Lavrov confirmed that the bombing of the hospital was a deliberate action. He stated, "A few days ago, at a UN Security Council meeting, the Russian delegation presented factual information that this maternity hospital had long been taken over by the Azov Battalion and other radicals and that all the women in labour, all the nurses and in general all the staff had been told to leave it. It was a base of the ultra-radical Azov Battalion." On 10 March 2022, Twitter removed a tweet from the Russian embassy in the UK which claimed that the Mariupol hospital attack was "fake" and that Marianna Vyshegirskaya, one of the victims was an "actress" by citing her blogging career, as a violation of Twitter rules. British politicians welcomed the move and accused the Russian embassy of disinformation. Meduza stated that the Russian representative to the United Nations, Vasily Nebenzya, had on 7 March referred to Maternity Hospital No 1 as a hospital that he claimed was used by Ukrainian armed forces as a firing point, not Maternity Hospital No 3. Meduza described Lavrov as having confused Hospital No 1, referred to by Nebenzya, with the hospital that was bombed, Hospital No 3. On 22 March 2022, Russian journalist Alexander Nevzorov was charged under Russia's "fake news" law after he published information about the Russian shelling of a maternity hospital in Mariupol. Under a new law passed on 4 March, he could be sentenced to up to 15 years in prison.

Theatre airstrike 

On 16 March, Ukraine accused Russian forces of shelling civilian areas in Mariupol. Artillery hit numerous locations, including a swimming pool building and a vehicle convoy; shelling then struck the Donetsk Regional Drama Theatre that was being used as an air raid shelter with a large number of civilians inside, the building was reduced to rubble. The bomb shelter in the basement of the theatre survived the bombing, but many people were still trapped underneath the burning rubble. A member of the Ukrainian parliament from Mariupol, Dmytro Gurin, said that the rescue efforts were hampered due to continued attacks on the area by Russian forces.

By 17 March, the number of casualties was unclear; some emerged alive. By 18 March, around 130 survivors had been rescued. Mariupol City Council stated that according to initial information, no one had been killed, although one person was gravely wounded. On 25 March, Mariupol City Council estimated that about 300 people had been killed as a result of the airstrike. On 4 May, Associated Press published an investigation with evidence pointing to 600 dead in the airstrike. Many survivors estimated around 200 people–including rescuers–escaping through the main exit or one side entrance; the other side and the back were crushed. Estimates of civilian deaths vary, ranging from at least a dozen (Amnesty International) to 600 (Associated Press).

Ukraine accused the Russian Armed Forces of deliberately bombing the theatre while it was sheltering civilians. Russia first claimed that the reason the theatre was bombed was because it was "being used as a base by the Ukrainian military", and then denied the allegations and instead accused the Azov Battalion of blowing up the building, Both Russian claims have been refuted by independent investigation. The theatre is among the many Ukrainian heritage and cultural sites destroyed during the invasion. The attack was classified as a war crime by the Organization for Security and Co-operation in Europe and Amnesty International.

Kramatorsk railway bombing 

At 10:24 and 10:25, media affiliated with the People's Republic of Donetsk published videos showing a pair of missiles being launched from Shakhtarsk, a city under separatist control. At approximately 10:30, two missiles hit near the railway station building in Kramatorsk, and the first reports were published in Ukrainian media at around 10:45. According to the Ukrainian government, between 1000 and 4000 civilians, mainly women and children, were present at the station awaiting evacuation from the region, which was being subjected to heavy Russian shelling. the attack left at least 60 dead and 110+ wounded. The missiles were initially misidentified as Iskander ballistic missiles. Pavlo Kyrylenko, governor of Donetsk oblast, later specified that they had rather been Tochka-U missiles armed with cluster munitions. The remnants of one of the missiles had the Russian words ЗА ДЕТЕЙ (za detey), meaning "[in revenge] for the children", painted in white on its outside. It also bore serial number Ш91579, which investigators said could potentially help trace it back to its original arsenal.

Initially, Russian state media and pro-Russian telegram channels claimed successful Russian airstrikes on a military transport target in Kramatorsk. However, after it became clear that the missiles had killed civilians, earlier reports were redacted, the Russian government also denied responsibility for the attack, and the Russian Ministry of Defence characterized it as a "Ukrainian hoax". The Russian Ministry of Defence later claimed that the missiles were launched by Ukrainian forces from the city of Dobropillia, southwest of Kramatorsk. Russian media also said that the serial number of the missile was in the same range as one used by Ukrainian forces, however, these claims were rapidly debunked. A fake video clip with a mock BBC logo, attributing blame to the Ukrainian forces, circulated through pro-Russian telegram channels and Russian state television since 10 April. However, the BBC said that it has not produced any such video. The Russian Ministry of Defense claimed that their forces no longer use Tochka-U missiles. However, Amnesty International had published videos about use of Tochka-U missiles in other cities before Kramatorsk. investigators from the open-source Belarusian Hajun Project had also published videos of several Russian trucks with Tochka missiles heading from Belarus to Ukraine with 'V' markings on 5 March and 30 March. The Institute for the Study of War assessed that the Russian 8th Guards Combined Arms Army, which is active in the Donbas area, is equipped with Tochka-U missiles.

Michelle Bachelet, the United Nations High Commissioner for Human Rights, Dunja Mijatović, the Council of Europe Commissioner for Human Rights, Ukrainian President Volodymyr Zelenskyy, European Commission President Ursula von der Leyen, French Foreign Minister Jean-Yves Le Drian, British Defence Secretary Ben Wallace, United Nations Secretary-General António Guterres and Oleksandr Kamyshin, chairman of Ukrainian Railways described the event as "war crimes" and "a crime against humanity". The Security Service of Ukraine opened criminal proceedings under Article 438 of the Criminal Code. Royal United Services Institute analyst Justin Bronk said that Russia aimed to damage Ukrainian transport infrastructure to make it difficult for Ukrainian forces to move around Donbas. He also suggested that Russia opted for the Tochka-U missile type due to its use by the Ukrainian army, in order to "muddy the waters". The Pentagon highlighted Russian responsibility for the attack, as well as the strategic importance of the railway junction.

Missile strike on Chasiv Yar 

A missile strike on two residential buildings in Chasiv Yar was carried out by the Russian Armed Forces at 21:17 local time on 9 July 2022. At least 48 people were killed, Due to the impact, a five-story residential building partially collapsed. Two entrances were completely destroyed. The strike was alleged, including by Donetsk Oblast governor Pavlo Kyrylenko, to have been performed with "Uragan", a self-propelled 220 mm multiple rocket launcher designed in the Soviet Union. The Russian Defense Ministry claimed that they destroyed a "temporary deployment point” of a Ukrainian territorial defence unit. As of 10 July, 67 rescue workers of the State Emergency Service of Ukraine were trying to help the victims and more than 20 people were still feared to be trapped under the rubble. Rescue and search operations continued until the morning of July 14, 2022. Rescuers dismantled about 525 tons of destroyed elements of the building. 323 employees of the State Emergency Service and 9 units of equipment were involved. As of 13 July, 48 dead were found under the rubble of the building, and nine wounded were rescued as of 12 July. A local resident told The New York Times that there were 10 elderly civilians in the buildings, but that members of the military had come to lodge there two days earlier. Two soldiers who probably took turns sleeping in the building after being on duty were among the dead. Andriy Yermak, the chief of staff to Ukraine's president, said that the strike was "another terrorist attack" and that Russia should be designated a "state sponsor of terrorism" as a result. Russian military spokesman Igor Konashenkov stated that Russia had killed "over 300 nationalists" in an attack on Chasiv Yar, but did not specify whether or not they were referring to the July airstrike or an earlier attack.

Landmine dispersal over Donetsk 
On 27 July 2022, thousands of miniature plastic antipersonnel PFM-1 mines were dispersed over civilian areas of the Russian held city of Donetsk by a BM-27 Uragan multiple rocket launcher. This resulted in a number of people being injured, most prominently Semen Pegov, a Russian war blogger calling himself "War Gonzo". The Russian Foreign Ministry and local sources accused the Ukrainian army of being responsible for their deployment. The so-called "butterfly mines" are banned under the 1997 Ottawa Treaty (signed by Ukraine but not by Russia) due to the high danger they pose to civilians. On 8 August, the UK Ministry of Defence issued a statement accusing Russia of carrying the attack.

Kharkiv Oblast

Bombing of Kharkiv 

During and after the Battle of Kharkiv, extensive parts of residential areas were destroyed by Russian shelling.

According to a HRW report published on 4 March, on 28 February, at around 10:00 AM, Russian forces fired cluster munitions with Grad rockets into at least three different residential areas in Kharkiv, killing at least nine civilians and injuring another 37. The city's mayor, Ihor Terekhov, said that four people were killed when they left a shelter to get water and a family of two parents and three children were burned alive in their car. The locations hit were residential buildings and a playground, dispersed between Industrialnyi and Shevchenkivskyi District. Explosions in the city were recorded as late as 2:23 PM.

On 1 March, a shell damaged a boarding school for blind children. As of 4 March 122 civilians including five children had been killed in the Kharkiv region, according to the Kharkiv Region Police. Out of an initial population of 1.8 million, only 500,000 people remained in Kharkiv by 7 March. On 18 March, the number of civilians reportedly killed in Kharkiv exceeded 450 as a consequence of the use of cluster munitions and explosive weapons in heavily populated areas of the city. On 24 March a cluster munition attack killed eight people were killed and fifteen were injured while queuing for humanitarian aid together with hundreds of civilians near the Akademika Pavlova metro station. On 24 March 2022, a Russian missile strike hit a shopping mall parking lot near the Akademika Pavlova metro station. At the time, hundreds of people were waiting outside a post office in the mall to obtain humanitarian aid. Six people were killed and at least 15 further were injured. Two further cluster bombings damaged the nearby Holy Trinity Church where volunteers were preparing humanitarian aid.

On 15 April 2022 in the afternoon hours, during the battle of Kharkiv, the Russian Army fired 9N210/9N235 cluster bombs into the Industrialnyi District, striking a residential area and a playground in the Myru Street. Nine civilians died and 35 were injured, including children. The local hospital received wounded people with pieces of steel rod and shrapnel in their limbs. Overall, the cluster bombs detonated over an area of 700 square metres.

Human Rights Watch investigated the attack and concluded that the Russian forces used Smerch cluster munition rockets, which disperse dozens of submunitions or bomblets in the air. As there were no military targets within 400 meters of these strikes and due to the indiscriminate use of these weapons against densely populated areas, HRW described these strikes as possible war crimes. On 13 May, CNN reported that newly collected evidence identified Colonel General Alexander Zhuravlyov commanding the 79th Rocket Artillery Brigade, ordered the use 17 cluster bombs, the 300mm Smerch Cluster Rocket, to be used against civilian targets in Kharkiv on 27–28 February.

On 13 June Amnesty International published a report on what it called the "relentless campaign of indiscriminate bombardments against Kharkiv" causing "wholesale destruction" in the city from 24 February until late April. The human rights organisation's researchers found fragments of seven cluster munition strikes in different neighbourhoods of Kharkiv and gathered evidence of the use of scatterable land mines and Grad rockets. Amnesty International documented overall 28 indiscriminate strikes in populated areas of Kharkiv which they claim may constitute war crimes, and which caused hundreds of civilian casualties and injured many more.

On 11 July 2022, a Russian wave of shelling killed six people and injured 31 in the Ukrainian city of Kharkiv. The mayor Ihor Terekhov said that the areas shelled were residential areas with "no military significance", including several civilian houses, stores, a tire repair store, and a school. Reuters confirmed that at least one residential structure had been hit. Authorities said that six civilians had died, including a 17-year old teenager and his father. Oleh Synyehubov said that the Russians had used "artillery, multiple rocket launchers and tank attacks" on Kharkiv.

On 16 August 2022, the Human Rights Watch documented that the Russian forces have assaulted Kharkiv with repeated unlawful attacks that killed and wounded civilians and damaged healthcare facilities and homes. All of the attacks were carried out in populated areas by indiscriminately using explosive weapons with wide area effects and widely banned cluster munitions in apparent violation of international humanitarian law.

On 17 August 2022, at 4:30 am, several rockets fired from Belgorod hit the Slobidskyi and Saltivskyi districts of Kharkiv. In the Slobidskyi District, a four-story hostel of a tram depot was hit together with adjacent repair workshop and an neighboring non-residential building. The second missile attack was carried out at 21:30 and destroyed a three-story hostel in the Saltivskyi district, where people with hearing impairments lived, The missile attack caused a fire, and the building was completely destroyed, In the Slobidskyi district, two people were killed initially killed, with the bodies of six people subsequently being excavated from under the ruins, 18 were also injured, including two children. Ten units of fire and rescue equipment worked at the scene of the shelling along with forty rescuers of the State Emergency Service. In the Saltivskyi district, at least 19 people were killed and 22 injured, including an 11-year-old child, in total, 27 (including 1 child) were killed and 44 (including 3 children) were injured. On 19 August, mourning was declared in Kharkiv.

The Russian Defense Ministry confirmed the missile attack on Kharkiv in its briefing, According to their version, “a high-precision ground-based weapon hit a temporary base for foreign mercenaries” and as a result, “more than 90 militants were destroyed”. President of Ukraine Volodymyr Zelensky said: "When you hear about Kharkiv Saltivka, it’s pain again. Pain for all Ukraine. Pain for Kharkiv," he wrote. "Rocket attack… On the hostel… The building is completely destroyed." The President described the killing of residents as "a vile and cynical blow to civilians, which has no justification and demonstrates the impotence of the aggressor". According to the head of the military administration of the Kharkiv region, Oleh Synyehubov: “The Russians brutally and purposefully attacked civilians. And now in their so-called "media" they are spreading another fake about "military facilities". There are no military installations. Exclusively civilian facilities, including pensioners and children. This is real terrorism, which only fiends are capable of!”.

Bombing of Izium 

On 3 March, Russian forces bombed the central hospital in Izium, Eight people died and the hospital sustained "significant damage". On 8 March, the same recently refurbished hospital in the city was destroyed during shelling, this was followed on 11 March by an attack to a psychiatric hospital. On 15 September 2022, after Ukrainian forces had retaken Izium, several mass graves were discovered of more than 440 bodies buried in a forest northeast of the city. among the dead, some had reportedly died as a result of shelling and airstrikes. Forensic investigations and questioning of witnesses were ongoing as of 16 September 2022.

Kyiv Oblast

Irpin refugee column shelling 

On 6 March 2022, from 9:30 a.m. until 2 p.m. local time, the Russian Armed Forces repeatedly shelled an intersection in Irpin that hundreds of civilians were using to escape to Kyiv, whilst a Ukrainian artillery position was located nearby. They killed at least eight Ukrainian civilians (including 2 children). Human Rights Watch alleged the Russian army carried out an "unlawful, indiscriminate and disproportionate attack". The incident was part of an assault on Irpin.

On that day, there were hundreds of civilians at the intersection on the P30 road, near the St. George's Ukrainian Orthodox Church, just south of a bridge that the Ukrainian army had destroyed to hinder the Russian invasion. The civilians were fleeing the Russian army's advance from Irpin towards Kyiv. In the intersection near the bridge were a dozen Ukrainian soldiers, some helping the civilians carry their luggage and children. No agreements had been reached between the parties about a temporary ceasefire or humanitarian corridor. Journalists of The New York Times and freelance journalists on the scene report that for several hours the Russian army bombarded the intersection that the civilians were using to flee. The Russians fired explosive projectiles into the area, with projectiles hitting the intersection or the surrounding area every 10 minutes, Among the victims were a group of four, including two children, who were killed by a mortar strike.

According to Human Rights Watch, it is possible that the projectiles were "observed" by the Russians, who would then know where they were landing and could easily have adjusted the aim away from the intersection. Instead they engaged in prolonged shelling of the intersection being used by civilians, which indicates "potential recklessness or deliberateness" on their part. The repeated nature of the attacks suggests that Russian forces "violated their obligations under international humanitarian law not to conduct indiscriminate or disproportionate attacks that harm civilians, and failed to take all feasible measures to avoid civilian casualties". The human rights organisation also stated that the Ukrainian forces "have an obligation to take all feasible precautions to avoid or minimize civilian harm," such as refraining from engaging in combat in populated areas.

Bombing of Kyiv 

Ukraine's capital Kyiv, a city of some three million people, was among the first targets of Russian airstrikes. Kindergartens and orphanages were also shelled.

10 October missile strike 

On 10 October, 8:00 a.m. local time, several explosions rang out in the Shevchenkivskyi and Solomianskyi District of Kyiv. This was announced by the mayor of the capital Vitali Klitschko. According to Anton Herashchenko, the adviser to the head of the Ministry of Internal Affairs, one of the rockets in Kyiv fell near the monument to Mykhailo Hrushevsky on the Volodymyrskaya street. A missile struck the Kyiv Glass Bridge at 8:18 local time. The blast wave damaged the building and the roof of the central station Kyiv-Passenger. The Russian Armed Forces damaged Ukrainian cultural and educational buildings, including the Taras Shevchenko National University of Kyiv, the Khanenko Museum and the Taras Shevchenko National Museum.

According to Rostyslav Smirnov, adviser to the Minister of Internal Affairs of Ukraine, at least eight people were killed and 24 were injured as a result of several hits in different places in Kyiv. Areas struck by missiles included nearby a children's playground. A fire broke out in six cars, and more than 15 cars were damaged. The Kyiv Metro's red line and the Teatralna–Golden Gate interchange node subway trains stopped running and the underground tunnels became shelters for citizens.

Bombing of Borodianka 

As Russian forces fought in and near Kyiv, Borodianka, which is on a strategically important road, was targeted by numerous Russian airstrikes. Most of the buildings in the town were destroyed, including almost all of its main street. Russian bombs struck the centers of buildings and caused them to collapse while the frames remained standing. Many civilians were also reportedly killed by cluster munitions during the attacks. Oleksiy Reznikov, minister of defense, said many residents were buried alive by airstrikes and lay dying for up to a week. Some residents hid in caves for 38 days.

Only a few hundred residents remained in Borodianka by the time the Russians withdrew, with roughly 90% of residents having fled, and an unknown number dead in the rubble. Borodianka's mayor estimated at least 200 dead. Agence France-Presse arrived in Borodianka on 5 April. The AFP did not see any bodies, but reported widespread destruction, and that some homes "simply no longer existed". The human death toll remained unclear: one resident reported that he knew of at least five civilians killed, but that others were beneath the rubble and that no one had yet attempted to extricate them. According to Europe 1, ten days after the Russian army had left, firefighters were still working to recover bodies from the rubble in order to bury them with dignity. Their work was complicated by the risk of other buildings collapsing. More bodies were discovered daily. Local morgues were overwhelmed, and corpses had to be transported 100 kilometres or more.

Shelling of Bucha and Hostomel 

Ukrainian forensic investigations on the Bucha massacre revealed that dozens of civilians had been killed by metal darts ("fléchettes") of a kind used by the Russian army. Bodies from the Bucha-Irpin region showed lesions from small nail-like objects contained in tank or field gun shells. According to witnesses, Russian artillery fired shells that spread fléchettes a few days before retreating from the area at the end of March. While fléchettes are not prohibited under international law, their use in residential areas may qualify as the war crime of indiscriminate attack. The spokesperson for the Ukrainian Ground Forces stated that Ukraine's military does not use shells with fléchettes.

According to Oleg Tkalenko, deputy chief prosecutor of the Kyiv region, forensic experts found fragments of cluster munitions in bodies from mass graves in Bucha after the retreat of Russian troops, the exact number of civilians killed specifically due to the use of cluster munitions in the village was unknown, but at least 8 out of about 500 of those found were reportedly killed by their use, The Guardian later confirmed the use of RBK-500 cluster munitions with PTAB-submunitions and cluster missiles fired by the BM-30 Smerch in Bucha. The mayor of the city, Anatoly Fedoruk, stated that "Bucha was turned into a Chechen safari, where land mines were used against civilians", cluster munition fragments were also found in the nearby city of Hostomel, many of them in animal carcasses.

Luhansk Oblast

Bilohorivka school bombing 

On 7 May Russian forces bombed a school in Bilohorivka where about ninety people were seeking shelter from the ongoing fighting during the Battle of Sievierodonetsk. The building caught on fire and trapped large numbers of people inside. At least 30 people were rescued. Two people were confirmed to have been killed, but Governor of Luhansk Oblast Serhiy Haidai said that the 60 remaining people were believed to have been killed.

The attack was condemned by the Ukrainian Foreign Ministry and UN secretary-general Antonio Guterres, who said he was "appalled" by the attack, he also reminded that "civilians and civilian infrastructure must always be spared in times of war". Liz Truss, the British foreign secretary, said that she was "horrified" and described the attack as constituting war crimes.

Stara Krasnianka care house attack 

On 7 March the Ukrainian armed forces occupied a care house in the  village of Stara Krasnianka, near Kreminna, Luhansk region, and set up a firing position there without first evacuating the  residents. On 9 March, the Ukrainian forces based at the  care house engaged in a first exchange of fire with Russian affiliated armed groups without  casualties among the civilian residents. On 11 March 2022 pro-Russian  separatist forces attacked the care house with heavy weapons while 71  patients with disabilities and 15 members of staff were still inside. A fire  broke out and approximately fifty people died. A group of residents fled the  house and ran into the forest, until they were met five kilometers away by  Russian affiliated armed groups, who provided them with assistance.

Ukraine officials accused the Russian forces of deliberately targeting a  medical facility and forcefully deporting the survivors. On 29 June, a  report of the OHCHR described the incident as "emblematic" of its concern over the  potential use of human shields to prevent military  operations.

Mykolaiv Oblast

Bombing of Mykolaiv 

Cluster munitions were repeatedly used also on Mykolaiv during separate attacks on 7, 11 and 13 March, causing civilian casualties and extensive destruction of non-military objects. In the 13 March attack nine civilians, including two children, were killed and 13 injured while waiting in line on the street at a cash machine. The explosions also damaged houses and civilian buildings. Human Rights Watch analysed the incident and found that the Russian forces used Smerch and Uragan cluster munition on densely populated areas. Due to the inherently indiscriminate nature of cluster munitions, Human Rights Watch described their use in Mykolaiv as a possible Russian war crime.

On 28 June, Russian shelling damaged the Central City Stadium. On the following day, a Russian rocket strike hit an 5-storey residential building, killing at least 8 people and injuring 6. On 15 July, the two largest universities of the city were struck by missiles: Admiral Makarov National University of Shipbuilding and the Mykolaiv National University. On 29 July, Russian forces bombed a bus stop. 5 were killed and 7 were injured.

Odesa Oblast

Bombing of Odesa 

On 3 March, the nearby villages of Zatoka and Bilenke were shelled, killing at least one civilian in Bilenke. On 23 April, a Russian missile strike hit two residential buildings. killing eight civilians and wounding 18 or 20, according to Ukraine. One missile that struck a residential building killed a three-month old baby, the mother, and the baby's maternal grandmother. On 9 May, Russia fired three Kinzhal missiles to Odesa Oblast. At that time, President of the European Council Charles Michel and Prime Minister of Ukraine Denys Shmyhal were in Odesa and had to hide in a bomb shelter. In the evening of the same day, Russian troops fired rockets at three warehouses in Odesa and a shopping centre in the village of Fontanka near the city, One person was killed and two were injured in the warehouses, three people were also injured in the mall.

Serhiivka missile strike 

According to preliminary information, on the morning of 1 July at 01:00 AM (UTC+3) three Tu-22M3 strategic bombers of the Russian Air Force flew from the Volgograd Oblast to Crimea and after  fired three Kh-22s, supersonic anti-ship missiles designed for use against aircraft carriers, into a 9-store apartment building and a recreational center in the settlement of Serhiivka, Bilhorod-Dnistrovskyi Raion, Odessa Oblast. A missile hit the apartment, one section of the building was completely destroyed. The fire also spread from the apartment building to an attached store. at least 16 Ukrainian civilians were killed in the residential building. Two missiles hit the recreational center, killing at least 5 (including a 12-year-old boy). 38 more were also wounded, including 6 children.

2 July was declared a day of mourning in the region. Ukrainian President Zelenskyy accused Russia of having committed "an act of conscious, deliberately targeted Russian terror – and not some kind of mistake". He noted that as in the recent Kremenchuk shopping mall attack, the Russian army "used unnecessarily powerful weapons to strike a civilian object".

A spokesman of the Russian Presidency, Dmitry Peskov, denied that Russia was attacking civilian objects in Ukraine and said that the targeted buildings were used for military purposes. Amnesty International visited the locations and studied satellite imagery, finding no evidence that the targeted buildings were used by the military. Official representative of Germany  described the missile strike as an "inhumane and cynical" war crime.

Poltava Oblast

Kremenchuk shopping mall attack 

On 27 June 2022, the Russian Armed Forces fired two Kh-22 anti-ship missiles into central Kremenchuk, Poltava Oblast, hitting the Amstor shopping mall. A fire broke out, and, according to Dmytro Lunin, Governor of Poltava Oblast, the attack killed at least 20 people and injured at least 56. 36 people were also initially reported missing. According to the Ukrainian Armed Forces, the attack was carried out by Russian Tu-22M3 strategic bombers that took off from the Shaykovka air base in the Kaluga region. The missiles were launched over the territory of the Kursk region. Ukrainian Interior Minister Denys Monastyrsky said that the missile hit the far end of the shopping mall.

On the day of the attack, Russian television did not report it until the Russian Ministry of Defense confirmed that it had happened. Pro-Russian Telegram channels have spread multiple conflicting theories about the missile strike, including the claim that the missile was aimed at a car factory near the mall, that the mall was being used as a military equipment warehouse, or as a base of the Territorial Defense Forces, and that the missile strike is a Ukrainian provocation involving the use of "canned bodies". On the day after the attack, Russian authorities and state-controlled media issued a number of contradictory statements about the attack, including claims that the attack was "fake" and that the Ukrainian army had bombed the mall themselves. Russian Defense Ministry spokesman Igor Konashenkov said: "The detonation of the munitions for western weaponry in storage led to a fire in a non-functioning shopping centre next to the factory." The claims that the shopping mall was "non-functional" have been debunked by several organizations. According to Ukrainian President Volodymyr Zelenskyy, there were more than 1,000 people inside the mall when the strike occurred, The non-profit online journalism collective Bellingcat used receipts from recent purchases at the mall to prove that the mall had been open prior to the attack. the BBC also published interviews with people who were working or shopping in the mall at the time. Per reports from independent military experts and researchers with Molfar, a global open sourced intelligence community, the factory and mall were too far apart from one another to cause any fires or explosions.

The leaders of the G7 nations, US Secretary of State Antony Blinken British Prime Minister Boris Johnson, Ukrainian president Volodymyr Zelenskyy, Ukraine's Foreign Minister, Dmytro Kuleba and Mayor  described the attack as "war crimes", "crimes against humanity" and "indiscriminate attacks", as well claiming that the attack was intentional and that there were "no close military targets"

Rivne Oblast

Bombing of Rivne 
On 14 March, Russian troops carried out two airstrikes against the Rivnenska TV Tower, as a result of which 21 people were killed and 9 were injured. Rockets hit the television tower and administrative buildings nearby. On 25 June, a rocket attack was carried out on civilian infrastructure in the city of Sarny, at least four people were killed and seven others were injured. On the morning of 22 October 2022, Russian troops launched a missile attack on energy infrastructure, as a result of the attack, electric substations were damaged. There were no casualties.

Sumy Oblast

Okhtyrka school bombing 
On 27 February, Amnesty International stated that it had analysed evidence showing that Russian cluster munitions from a 220 mm BM-27 Uragan rocket had hit a preschool in Okhtyrka where civilians were taking shelter on 25 February, killing three, including a child. UAV film showed four hits on the roof of the preschool, three on the ground next to the school, two injured or dead civilians, and pools of blood. Amnesty International analysed 65 photos and videos of the event and interviewed local residents. Bellingcat stated that remains of the 9M27K rocket were found 200 metres east of the kindergarten. Russian forces were located west of Okhtyrka. Amnesty described the rocket type as "unguided and notoriously inaccurate", and described the attack as a potential war crime that should be investigated.

Bombing of Sumy 

In the evening and throughout the night on 7 March Russian forces executed an airstrike on Sumy's residential neighbourhood. About 22 people were killed, including three children. Under the procedural guidance of the Sumy District Prosecutor's Office, criminal proceedings have been instituted for violating the laws and customs of war.

Vinnytsia oblast

Vinnytsia missile strike 

At about 10:10 AM on 14 July 2022, an air raid alarm sounded in the city. At approximately 10:42 local residents reported three explosions in the city. Before that, local residents noticed a missile flying over Bershad city and Vinnytsia. According to Ukrainian authorities, the Russian Naval Forces fired five Kalibr cruise missiles from a submarine in the Black Sea. Ukraine claims that two of the missiles were shot down. But, according to Ukrainian officials, two missiles also struck civilian buildings, including a medical center, offices, stores and residential buildings in the center of the city. The attacks killed at least 28 people (including three children), and injured at least 202 others.

Local officials pointed out that Kalibr missiles are high-precision which indicates that the Russians purposefully targeted civilians.  The strike has been labeled as a war crime by officials from multiple countries. Ukrainian president Volodymyr Zelenskyy wrote on his Telegram channel: "Vinnytsia. Missile strikes in the city centre. There are wounded and killed, among them a little child. Every day, Russia destroys the civilian population, kills Ukrainian children, directs rockets at civilian objects. Where there is nothing military. What is this if not an open terrorist attack? Inhuman. Country of killers. A country of terrorists". The strike has also been labeled as a war crime by Ukrainian Interior Minister Denys Monastyrsky.

The Ministry of Defense of Russia officially recognized the attack on Vinnytsia the next day, saying that they hit the garrison house of officers, where allegedly "...a meeting of the command of the Ukrainian Air Force with representatives of foreign arms suppliers was taking place..." According to them, most participants of the meeting were killed. Among the dead were allegedly three officers of the Air Force of Ukraine. The missile strike occurred during a conference in The Hague on holding Russia accountable for war crimes. The ambassador of Moldova to Ukraine, Valeriu Chiveri, condemned the attack on Vinnytsia, referring to attacks on civilian targets in Ukrainian cities away from the frontlines as crimes against humanity. He also mentioned the European Union's decision to grant candidate status to both Moldova and Ukraine and talked about the need for both countries to work together.

Zhytomyr Oblast

Bombing of Zhytomyr 

On 1 March, late in the evening, Russian troops hit a residential sector of the city. About 10 residential buildings on Shukhevych street and around the city hospital were damaged. A few bombs were dropped on the city. As a result, at least two Ukrainian civilians were killed and three were injured. On 2 March, shells hit the regional perinatal center and some private houses. On 4 March, rockets hit the 25th Zhytomyr school destroying half of the school. On 8 March, in an air assault, a dormitory was hit. On 9 March, the outskirts of the city (Ozerne district) came under fire.

Zaporizhzhia Oblast

Bombing of Zaporizhzhia 

One civilian was killed and two others injured when five Russian shells were fired at Zaporizhzhia at 7.15pm on 12 August. Further city infrastructure in the Shevchenkivskyi district was also damaged in the shelling.

During the night of 19 September, Zaporizhzhia was hit by eight Russian rockets in its industrial and residential areas. Followed by another rocket attack in the morning, striking the regional center near the Dnieper river. Two days later the city was again hit by two Russian rockets during the night, followed by another five rockets attacks in the daytime. The regional center was hit an additional two times while other infrastructure and residential houses were damaged, two of the projectiles landed in a field on the outskirts of the city. The attack wounded three civilians. The following day on 22 September, nine more rockets were fired at the city. One of the projectiles hit a hotel in the city's central park, killing one civilian and injuring five others. An electrical substation and several high-rise residential buildings were also damaged. Later that same day, ten more rockets struck the city and damaged about a dozen private homes.

At 5.08am on 6 October, seven Russian rockets were fired towards the city center of Zaporizhzhia. Several residential buildings were destroyed and fires broke out due to the attack, killing 17 civilians and injuring 12 more. Zaporizhzhia was attacked once more during the night of 7 October, but this time by Iranian Shahed-136 kamikaze drones used by the Russian forces. The attack resulted in the deaths of 12 civilians with a further 13 injured and 15 missing.

Around 3am on 9 October, 12 Russian tactical missiles were launched against civilian infrastructure in Zaporizhzhia. Most missiles hit both high-rise buildings and residential houses, with a nine-story building being partially destroyed after the attack. A further five high-rise buildings, 20 residential houses and four schools were damaged alongside 20 cars. A total of 13 civilians were killed in the attack, while 89 more were injured. The following day at 1.45am, about seven Russian S-300 anti-aircraft missiles struck the city resulting in the deaths of eight civilians. On 23 November, Russian missile strikes destroyed a maternity ward in Ukraine's Zaporizhzhia region, in the town of Vilnyansk, killing a newborn baby.

Civilian convoy attack 

On 30 September, a Russian S-300 missile hit a civilian convoy of civilian cars near Zaporizhzhia killing 32 people, including a three-month-old child. and injuring around 88. People in cars had gathered in a logistic hub to register for entering Russian-occupied territories in the south, such as the cities of Mariupol and Melitopol, and they were planning either to return home or to meet relatives and take them back to government-controlled territory. According to a spokesperson for the local governor's office, the attack on civilians was deliberate as no military objective was placed near the site. It occurred hours before Russia formally annexed four regions of Ukraine, including Zaporizhzhia Oblast.

Residential building airstrike 

On 9 October, 3 a.m. (UTC+3:00), six missiles were launched at a residential area in Zaporizhzhia, destroying an apartment building and damaging 70 other buildings. The attack resulted in the deaths of 13 people, including a child. Another 89 were injured, 11 of whom are children. The missiles reportedly originated from Russian-controlled locations in Zaporizhzhia. The airstrike took place the day after an explosion damaged large parts of the Crimean Bridge, which Russian president Vladimir Putin accused Ukraine of carrying out, and called it an "act of terrorism".

10 October missile strikes 

On 10 October, at 1.45am, about seven Russian S-300 anti-aircraft missiles struck the city resulting in the deaths of eight civilians. Later on the day, an apartment block was destroyed and a kindergarten was damaged by shelling. 5 people were killed and 8 were injured in that shelling.

Placement of military objectives near civilian objects 

Both the Russian and the Ukrainian army have been accused of violating international humanitarian law by locating military objectives within densely populated areas without removing civilians to safer areas. International humanitarian law requires all parties to the conflict to avoid, to the extent feasible, "locating military objectives within or near densely populated areas" and requires them to "remove civilian persons and objects under its control from the vicinity of military objectives". Contrary to the use of human shields, these fighting tactics do not involve utilizing the presence of civilians to render certain areas immune from military operations.

On 29 June, the Office of the United Nations High Commissioner for Human Rights expressed concern about Russian and Ukrainian armed forces taking up positions close to civilian objects without taking measures for protecting the civilians. The human rights agency had also received reports of the use of human shields. OHCHR documented the consequences of these fighting tactics in the case of a care house in Stara Krasnianka where the Ukrainian army had set up a firing position without first evacuating the residents, and in the case of a school in Yahidne, where 360 residents including 74 children were held captive by Russian forces for almost a month. Similar concerns were raised also by a report published on 20 July by the Organization for Security and Co-operation in Europe and by Human Rights Watch on 21 July.

On 4 August, Amnesty International reported that it had found evidence that Ukrainian forces had repeatedly put civilians in danger by establishing bases and firing positions in populated residential areas, including schools and hospitals; some areas were kilometres away from front lines and, according to Amnesty International, alternative locations were available to the Ukrainian army. Between April and July, Amnesty International researchers found evidence that Ukrainian military objectives had been placed within residential areas in 19 towns and villages in the Kharkiv, Donbas and Mykolaiv regions. Amnesty International's Secretary General Agnès Callamard stated that there was "a pattern of Ukrainian forces putting civilians at risk and violating the laws of war when they operate in populated area". The Amnesty report sparked significant outrage in Ukraine and the West and Oksana Pokalchuk, head of Amnesty International in Ukraine, resigned from her post and left the organization in protest over the publication of the report. Amnesty's report was criticized by military and legal experts such as John Spencer, a specialist in urban warfare studies, who stated that advising Ukrainian forces not to be in urban areas did not make sense, as the circumstances of the war necessitated that. United Nations war crime investigator Marc Garlasco stated that the Amnesty report got the law wrong, and also that Ukraine was making efforts to protect civilians, including helping them to relocate.

In mid-October 2022, the UN Independent International Commission of Inquiry on Ukraine released a report which included findings that both Russian and Ukrainian forces had "deployed their military assets and troops in ways that can endanger civilians".

See also

 2022 Russian strikes against Ukrainian infrastructure
 Accusations of genocide in Donbas
 Allegations of genocide of Ukrainians in the 2022 Russian invasion of Ukraine
 Legality of the 2022 Russian invasion of Ukraine
 Russia–Ukraine relations
 Russo-Ukrainian War
 Casualties of the Russo-Ukrainian War
 Russian war crimes#Ukraine
 Use of white phosphorus bombs in the 2022 Russian invasion of Ukraine
 War in Donbas
 War crimes in Donbas
 Russian–Syrian hospital bombing campaign

Notes

References

External links

 Guide to investigating war crimes at Global Investigative Journalism Network by investigative journalist Manisha Ganguly
 Contact websites for those providing evidence
 Contact pathway of the Office of the Prosecutor of the International Criminal Court
 Ukrainian government website for collecting evidence on war crimes committed by Russian forces
 Map of likely war crimes in Ukraine by Bellingcat
 Videos
 Video of drone flyover of apartment buildings being bombed in Mariupol. News.com.au, The News Room, March 15 2022
 Video of tanks firing repeatedly on apartment buildings in Mariupol, civilians in hospital, woman crying for dead children. AP News, 12 March 2022.
 Video of aftermath, including injured pregnant woman being carried, after Russian airstrike on hospital in Mariupol, Ukraine. Sky News, March 9, 2022
 CBS News video about pattern of rape by Russian soldiers against Ukrainian women during the invasion.

Articles containing video clips

War crimes in Ukraine